Henri Jules de Bourbon (29 July 1643, in Paris – 1 April 1709, in Paris, also Henri III de Bourbon) was prince de Condé, from 1686 to his death. At the end of his life he suffered from clinical lycanthropy and was considered insane.

Biography
Henri Jules was born to Louis II de Bourbon, Prince de Condé in 1643. He was five years younger than King Louis XIV of France. He was the sole heir to the enormous Condé fortune and property, including the Hôtel de Condé and the Château de Chantilly. His mother, Princess Claire-Clémence de Maillé-Brézé, was a niece of Cardinal Richelieu. He was baptised at the Église Saint-Sulpice, Paris on his day of birth. For the first three years of his life, while his father was duc d'Enghien, he was known at court as the duc d'Albret.

Upon the death of his grandfather, he succeeded to his father's courtesy title of duc d'Enghien. As a member of the reigning House of Bourbon, he was born a prince du sang styled as Monsieur le Duc.

Throughout much of his life, Henri Jules was mentally unstable. He was a short, ugly, debauched, and brutal man not only "repulsive in appearance", but "cursed with so violent a temper that it was 
positively dangerous to contradict him".

Trained as a soldier, in 1673, he was nominally put in charge of the Rhine front. This was in name only though, because Henri Jules lacked the military skills of his father. He was well educated but had a malicious character. A possible bride who was considered for him at this time was his distant cousin, Élisabeth Marguerite d'Orléans, daughter of Gaston d'Orléans. However, a marriage did not materialise.

He eventually married the German princess Anne Henriette of Bavaria in the chapel of the Palais du Louvre in Paris, in December 1663. The bride was the daughter of Edward, Count Palatine of Simmern and the political hostess Anna Gonzaga. The couple had ten children, only half of whom lived to adulthood. The young princess was noted for her pious, generous and charitable nature. Many at court praised her for her very supportive attitude towards her disagreeable husband. Despite her good qualities though, Henri Jules, who was prone to great rages, would often beat his quiet wife.

In addition, Henri Jules had an illegitimate daughter by Françoise-Charlotte de Montalais. The child was known variously as Julie de Bourbon, Julie de Gheneni (anagram of Enghien, aka de Guenani), or Mademoiselle de Châteaubriant. She was legitimised in 1693 when she was 25 years of age. She died on 10 March 1710, at the age of 43.

He was succeeded by his only son, Louis III de Bourbon.

Ancestry

Issue

References

External links

1643 births
1709 deaths
Dukes of Enghien
202
Dukes of Montmorency
Grand Masters of France
Henri
Henry III Jules de Bourbon, prince de Conde
Henri
Candidates for the Polish elective throne
17th-century peers of France
18th-century peers of France